No. 317 "City of Wilno" Polish Fighter Squadron was a Polish fighter squadron formed in Great Britain as part of an agreement between the Polish Government in Exile and the United Kingdom in 1941. It was one of several Polish fighter squadrons fighting alongside the Royal Air Force during World War II.

History
The squadron was formed at RAF Acklington on 22 February 1941 and reached operational readiness on 24 April 1941. It was equipped with Hurricane Mk.Is until July when it received Mk.IIs. The squadron moved south in June and received Spitfires in October. As with most Fighter Command squadrons it alternated its operations between offensive sweeps from bases in the south and defensive duties whilst based in the north and midlands.

In June 1943 the squadron was allocated to the 2nd Tactical Air Force and moved to RAF Heston. During the buildup to the invasion of Normandy the squadron carried out offensive sweeps in preparation for the landings. After the invasion they conducted ground attack operations in support of Allied ground forces, moving to the continent in August.
The squadron arrived in Belgium in October 1944 and Germany in April 1945, remaining there as part of the occupation forces until disbanding as a Polish fighter unit on 3 January 1947 (it had earlier disbanded as a RAF fighter unit at RAF Hethel on 18 December 1946).

Commanding officers

Aircraft operated

References

Notes

Bibliography

 Halley, James J. The Squadrons of the Royal Air Force & Commonwealth 1918–1988. Tonbridge, Kent, UK: Air Britain (Historians) Ltd., 1988. .
 Jefford, C.G. RAF Squadrons, a Comprehensive Record of the Movement and Equipment of all RAF Squadrons and their Antecedents since 1912. Shrewsbury, Shropshire, UK: Airlife Publishing, 2001. .
 Józefiak, Stanislaw. God, Honour and Country: A True Story. Nottingham, UK: S. Józefiak, 1997. .
 Rawlings, John D.R. Fighter Squadrons of the RAF and their Aircraft. London: Macdonald & Jane's (Publishers)Ltd., 1969 (revised edition 1976, reprinted 1978). .

External links

 Photo Gallery of 317 Squadron
 History of No.'s 300–318 Squadrons at RAF Web
 Personnel of the Polish Air Force in Great Britain 1940-1947

317
317
317
317
Military units and formations established in 1941
Military units and formations disestablished in 1947